In geometry and mechanics, a displacement is a vector whose length is the shortest distance from the initial to the final position of a point P undergoing motion. It quantifies both the distance and direction of the net or total motion along a straight line from the initial position to the final position of the point trajectory. A displacement may be identified with the translation that maps the initial position to the final position.

A displacement may be also described as a relative position (resulting from the motion), that is, as the final position  of a point relative to its initial position . The corresponding displacement vector can be defined as the difference between the final and initial positions:

In considering motions of objects over time, the instantaneous velocity of the object is the rate of change of the displacement as a function of time. The instantaneous speed, then, is distinct from velocity, or the time rate of change of the distance travelled along a specific path. The velocity may be equivalently defined as the time rate of change of the position vector. If one considers a moving initial position, or equivalently a moving origin (e.g. an initial position or origin which is fixed to a train wagon, which in turn moves on its rail track), the velocity of P (e.g. a point representing the position of a passenger walking on the train) may be referred to as a relative velocity, as opposed to an absolute velocity, which is computed with respect to a point which is considered to be 'fixed in space' (such as, for instance, a point fixed on the floor of the train station).

For motion over a given interval of time, the displacement divided by the length of the time interval defines the average velocity, which is a vector, and differs thus from the average speed, which is a scalar quantity.

Rigid body 
In dealing with the motion of a rigid body, the term displacement may also include the rotations of the body. In this case, the displacement of a particle of the body is called linear displacement (displacement along a line), while the rotation of the body is called angular displacement.

Derivatives 
The first two derivatives are frequently encountered in physics.

Velocity
 
Acceleration

Jerk

These common names correspond to terminology used in basic kinematics.  By extension, the higher order derivatives can be computed in a similar fashion.  Study of these higher order derivatives can improve approximations of the original displacement function.  Such higher-order terms are required in order to accurately represent the displacement function as a sum of an infinite series, enabling several analytical techniques in engineering and physics. The fourth order derivative is called jounce.

See also

 Displacement field (mechanics)
 Equipollence (geometry)
 Motion vector
 Position vector
 Affine space

References

External links

Motion (physics)
Length
Vector physical quantities
Geometric measurement
Kinematic properties